Saint-Rogatien is a commune in the Charente-Maritime department in the Nouvelle-Aquitaine region in southwestern France.

Besides the town, the town includes the area of Casse-Mortier and part of the village Pommerou, shared with the town of Clavette. Its inhabitants are called Rogatiens and Rogatiennes.

Gallery

Église Saint-Rogatien-Saint-Donatien
 This church built of limestone in the 12th century and renovated in the 19th century is dedicated to Nantes' two martyrs, partially destroyed during the Wars of Religion, it is largely late medieval but retains its Romanesque portal and a Gothic trefoil recess. The choir stalls were rebuilt in large part to the late Middle Ages. A granite tithe measure from the fifteenth or sixteenth century, is used as the church font. In 1871,  a bell tower was installed. In 1884, a restoration project was planned but didn't eventuate till 1987, when the facade was restored, the west weakened by weathering.

Population
In 2017, the municipality had 2,206 inhabitants.

Map of the Commune

See also
Communes of the Charente-Maritime département

References

Saintrogatien
Charente-Maritime communes articles needing translation from French Wikipedia